Albiano may refer to a number of small towns or villages in Italy:

in Piedmont
Albiano d'Ivrea, a town and commune in the Province of Turin

in Trentino-Alto Adige/Südtirol
Albiano (TN) a town and commune in the Province of Trento

in Tuscany
Albiano (Anghiari), near Anghiari, Province of Arezzo
Albiano (AR), between Arezzo and Monterchi, Province of Arezzo
Albiano (Minucciano), near Minucciano, Province of Lucca
Albiano (Barga), near Barga, Province of Lucca
Santa Maria Albiano, near Camaiore, Province of Lucca
Albiano di Magra, a former commune of Lunigiana, suppressed in 1870; its territory today is divided between the communes of Aulla and Podenzana, Province of Massa-Carrara
Albiano (Montemurlo), a frazione of Montemurlo, Province of Prato

Albiano may also refer to an Italian football club:
A.S.D. Porfido Albiano, located in Albiano (TN)